Leptospermum oligandrum is a species of erect, spreading shrub that is endemic to the south-west of Western Australia. It has broadly egg-shaped to wedge-shaped leaves, white flowers arranged singly or in groups of up to three on the ends of short side branches and fruit that fall from the plant shortly after the seeds are released.

Description
The young stems are silky-hairy at first, later glabrous. The flower buds have egg-shaped, reddish brown bracts and bracteoles at the base but that usually fall off well before the flower opens.

Taxonomy and naming
Leptospermum oligandrum was first formally described in 1852 by Nikolai Turczaninow in the Bulletin de la Classe Physico-Mathématique de l'Académie Impériale des Sciences de Saint-Pétersbourg from material collected by James Drummond.

Distribution and habitat
This tea-tree usually grows in heath or scrub and is widespread in the Avon Wheatbelt, Esperance Plains, Geraldton Sandplains, Jarrah Forest, Mallee and Swan Coastal Plain biogeographic regions of  Western Australia.

Conservation status
This species is classified as "not threatened" by the Western Australian Government Department of Parks and Wildlife.

References

oligandrum
Flora of Western Australia
Plants described in 1852
Taxa named by Nikolai Turczaninow